Stanley Newman (28 August 1907 – 20 August 1956) was a New Zealand cricketer. He played in one first-class match for Wellington in 1929/30.

See also
 List of Wellington representative cricketers

References

External links
 

1907 births
1956 deaths
New Zealand cricketers
Wellington cricketers
Cricketers from Nelson, New Zealand